Andreas Joseph Hofmann (14 July 1752 – 6 September 1849) was a German philosopher and revolutionary active in the Republic of Mainz. As Chairman of the Rhenish-German National Convention, the earliest parliament in Germany based on the principle of popular sovereignty, he proclaimed the first republican state in Germany, the Rhenish-German Free State, on 18 March 1793.  A strong supporter of the French Revolution, he argued for an accession of all German territory west of the Rhine to France and served in the administration of the department Mont-Tonnerre under the French Directory and the French Consulate.

Early life and education 

Hofmann was born in Zell am Main near Würzburg as the son of a surgeon. After the early death of his parents, he was educated by his uncle Fahrmann, likely Andreas Joseph Fahrmann (1742-1802), professor of moral theology at the University of Würzburg and later auxiliary bishop in the Diocese of Würzburg. After a one-year course in poetics and rhetoric at the Würzburg Jesuit college, Hofmann studied law at the University of Mainz and at the University of Würzburg. In Vienna, Hofmann was influenced by the enlightened principles of Josephinism. His satirical articles caused conflict with the authorities, and instead of being given a position at the newly re-founded University of Lviv as had been originally envisioned, he was forced to leave Austria. He returned to Würzburg in 1783, and was soon after employed by the Prince of Hohenzollern-Hechingen.

Professor and revolutionary in Mainz

In 1784, Hofmann was made Chair of Philosophy in Mainz as part of the progressive reforms of Elector Friedrich Karl von Erthal that had made the University of Mainz one of the centres of Catholic Enlightenment. Hofmann first taught History of Philosophy until 1791, when he also became chair of natural law. Besides philosophy and law, Hofmann also was talented in languages. He was proficient in Latin, Ancient Greek, French, Italian, and English, and offered classes in English on Alexander Pope over many years. As a liberal and progressive thinker, Hofmann supported the use of German instead of Latin in University lectures and in church. Eventually he became disillusioned with the pace of the reforms in Mainz and welcomed the French Revolution from the start. As Hofmann declared his support of the ideas of the French Revolution openly in his lectures, he was soon spied on by the increasingly reactionary Mainz authorities, who had outlawed all criticism of state and religion on 10 September 1792. However, before the investigation of his activities had progressed beyond the questioning of his students, the archbishop and his court fled from the advancing French troops under General Custine, who arrived in Mainz on 21 October 1792.

Two days later, Hofmann helped found the Mainz Jacobin club and became one of its most active members. A popular and powerful orator, he criticised both the old regime of the Elector and the French military government in his speeches, which were especially supported by the more radical students who idolised the incorruptible Hofmann. Hofmann and his supporters called for official posts to be reserved for native born citizens. Hofmann lectured in the rural areas of the French occupied territory, calling for support of the general elections in February and March 1793 which he helped organize. He was elected into the Rhenish-German National Convention as a representative of Mainz and became its president, beating Georg Forster in a contested election. On 18 March 1793 Hofmann declared the Rhenish-German Free State from the balcony of the Deutschhaus. Three days later, Hofmann signed the Convention's unanimously resolved decree asking for accession of the Free State to France. On 1 April 1793, Hofmann switched roles to become the president of the provisional administration.

French government official and later life 

After a short service in the military, where he commanded an equestrian regiment that fought against insurgent royalists in the Vendée and was wounded several times, he was sent to England on espionage missions. However, at a Joseph Haydn concert in London on 2 June 1794, he was recognized and reported to the authorities by his former student Klemens Wenzel von Metternich. Hofmann went into hiding and returned to Paris via Hamburg, where he visited Friedrich Gottlieb Klopstock. In Paris, he was made chief of the bureau des étrangers by the French Directory. In his 1795 essay , he argued for the Rhine as natural Eastern border of France. When the incorporation of areas west of the Rhine into France had become a reality with the Treaty of Campo Formio, Hofmann returned to Mainz, where he became part of the government of the new  Mont-Tonnerre and was appointed by Napoleon as its  (superior tax officer) in 1797, the only non-native French holding this office. In 1803, he was forced to resign as   after one of his subordinates had committed fraud, and 750,000 francs were missing from his coffers.

After Napoleon's defeat and the return of Mainz to German control, Hofmann moved to his late wife's estates in Winkel. While he was no longer active as a revolutionary, he was suspicious to the authorities as a Jacobin, and his house was searched in the 1830s. He died on 6 September 1849, having witnessed the failure of the 1848 revolution, and was buried without a Catholic funeral.

Family and legacy 
Andreas Joseph Hofmann was the son of Anton Hofmann, a surgeon, and of Magdalena Fahrmann. In 1788, he married Catharina Josepha Rivora (1763-1799), the daughter of Peter Maria Rivora and Christina Schumann. They had three daughters, of which two died early. His daughter Charlotte Sturm died in 1850 and bequeathed most of her belongings to Charlotte Lehne, the granddaughter of Hofmann's student Friedrich Lehne. 
None of Hofmann's personal papers and correspondence have been preserved, and there is no known picture of him. Overall, there is far less known about Hofmann's life than about most of the other leading members of the Mainz Jacobin club.

In 2018, a road in Winkel was named .

Selected works

Notable students 
 (1775-1855)
 (1771-1836)
Klemens von Metternich (1773-1859)
 (1771-1837)

Notes

References

1752 births
1849 deaths
Johannes Gutenberg University Mainz alumni
People from Würzburg (district)
18th-century German philosophers
German revolutionaries
Spies of the French Revolutionary and Napoleonic Wars
German male writers
Jacobins
19th-century German philosophers